ICCF Denmark belongs to the ICCF national member federations.

Creation of DSU
In 1903 several clubs in Jutland formed a chess federation, which was renamed Dansk Skak Union (Danish Chess Union) in 1905.

Achievements
In 1980, Jorn Sloth became the 8th Correspondence Chess World Champion.
European Champions: Jorn Sloth (8), Ove Ekebjaerg (10), Henrik Sorensen (13), Arne Sorensen (19), Bent Sorensen (20) and Sven Pedersen (21)

Titled players

Grandmaster
Erik Bang                   
Ove Ekebjærg                      
Niels Jørgen Fries Nielsen     
Curt Hansen                          
Arne Bjørn Jørgensen      
Jan du Jardin             
Allan Astrup Jensen  
Martin Lohse    
Jens Hartung Nielsen               
Allan Poulsen                      
Bent Sørensen                   
Jørn Sloth

Senior International Master 
Erik Barfoed                 
Anders Berggreen         
Lars Hyldkrog         
Svend Erik Kramer            
Ove Kroll                            
Niels Lauritsen                       
Henrik B. Pedersen                    
Ove Søgaard
Emil Christensen

International Master 
Svend Erik Andersen 
Nikolaj Borge                 
Jan S. Christensen           
Tonny Christiansen          
Niels Danstrup                  
Joe Flyckt-Olsen                 
Jens Ove Fries Nielsen         
Jens Haagen Hansen                
Mads Smith Hansen                 
Henrik Holmsgaard                   
Aage Ingerslev         
Ib V. N. Jensen           
Vagn Jensen                 
Klaus Høeck Johnsen    
Svend Kingsø                   
Poul Kleiminger               
Claes Løfgren            
Jens Bak Larsen                   
Hans Jørgen Lassen               
Torsten Lindestrøm                 
Hans Chr. Lykke       
Christian Waagner Nielsen     
Mogens (Esbjerg) Nielsen        
Jens Otto Pedersen                     
Sven Pedersen                   
Søren Peschardt                  
Viggo Bove Quist                 
Aksel Ros                    
Per Bille Sømod              
Arne Sørensen                  
Henrik Sørensen                 
Henrik Svane                      
Hans Tanggaard                   
Michael Tettinek                   
Keld Thomsen                        
Thomas Tronhjem

References

External links
 National site

Denmark
Chess in Denmark
Chess
Correspondence chess
Correspondence chess organizations